The Darlene Clark Hine Award is awarded annually by the Organization of American Historians for best book in African American women's and gender history. Darlene Clark Hine is an expert of African-American history and was President of the OAH in 2001–2002.

The following table lists past recipients.

References

American literary awards
Awards established in 2010
History books about the United States
American history awards